Distance Over Time is the fourteenth studio album by American progressive metal band Dream Theater, released on February 22, 2019, and the band's first release on Inside Out Music. Distance over Time was announced alongside a tour of North America during which Dream Theater would support the new album and celebrate the 20th anniversary of its fifth studio album, Metropolis Pt. 2: Scenes from a Memory (1999). On December 7, 2018, the lead single "Untethered Angel" and its music video were released. The second single, "Fall into the Light", was released on January 11, 2019. The third single, "Paralyzed", and its accompanying video were released on February 8, 2019. It is the band's most successful album chart-wise to date, taking top 10 positions in 19 countries (including going to number one in Germany and Switzerland).

Background and composition
Musically, Dream Theater decided to create a "tight and focused" album with a heavier sound than its previous album, The Astonishing (2016). "At Wit's End" was the first piece that was written and the writing process for the whole album took 18 days, making Distance Over Time their fastest written album to date. The band compared the speed and style of Distance over Time's writing process to that of its 2003 album, Train of Thought.

Dream Theater recorded the album in a cabin in Monticello, New York.

At just under 57 minutes long, not including a bonus track, Distance over Time is Dream Theater's first studio album with a run time under one hour in length since 1992's Images and Words, and their shortest since the band's 1989 debut, When Dream and Day Unite. It is Dream Theater's third studio album to not feature any songs longer than ten minutes, after When Dream and Day Unite and 2016's The Astonishing, and their first to include a song with lyrics written by Mike Mangini.

Critical reception 

Distance over Time was met with critical acclaim; it received an average score of 82/100 from 6 reviews on Metacritic, indicating "universal acclaim". Writing for AllMusic, Thom Jurek praised the album as a reaffirmation of Dream Theater's identity and appreciated its degree of freshness and energy. Consequence of Sound reviewed Distance over Time positively, stating that "Calling an hourlong album streamlined might seem strange, but that's exactly what Distance over Time is compared to Dream Theater's last release, 2016's 34-song, two hour and ten minute opus The Astonishing. Though the length is certainly shorter this time around, Dream Theater's expansive arrangements and complex songwriting haven't been scaled back on their 14th studio album.”  Kerrang! said, "Sacrificing none of that trademark musicianship, this is Dream Theater at their most accessible, and they lose nothing for it".

On the day of its release, Distance over Time reached the top spot on iTunes' Top 100 Albums list. Loudwire named it one of the 50 best metal albums of 2019.

Track listing

Personnel 
Credits adapted from Distance over Time liner notes

Dream Theater
 James LaBrie – lead vocals
 John Petrucci – guitars, production
 John Myung – bass, Moog Taurus pedals
 Jordan Rudess – keyboards
 Mike Mangini – drums

Production
 James "Jimmy T" Meslin – recording
 Richard Chycki – vocal recording, additional vocal production
 Ben Grosse – mixing
 Paul Pavao – mixing assistant
 Tom Baker – mastering
 Hugh Syme – art direction, illustration and design
 Mark Maryanovich – photography

Charts

Weekly charts

Year-end charts

References

2019 albums
Dream Theater albums
Sony Music albums